Amy Eliza Castles (25 July 1880 – 19 November 1951), was an Australian soprano.

Family
The daughter of Joseph Castles (1849-1933), and Mary Ellen Castles (1855-1937), née Fallon, Amy Eliza Castles was born in Melbourne, Australia on 25 July 1880. 

Her two sisters, Ethel Margaret "Dolly" Castles (1884–1971) and Eileen Anne Castles (1886–1970) were also highly regarded, talented sopranos.

Education
She was educated at St Kilian's primary school and St Mary's College.

Career
On 26 March 1910 she sang the title role in the Australian premiere of Giacomo Puccini's Madama Butterfly, at the Theatre Royal in Sydney.

She made her United States début at Carnegie Hall in 1917.

Castles never married. She lived with her sister, Dolly Castles, in Camberwell. She died at a hospital in Fitzroy, Victoria, on 19 November 1951. She was buried in Box Hill Cemetery.

Further reading
A New Melba?: The Tragedy of Amy Castles, Crossing Press (2006)

References

External links

1880 births
1951 deaths
Burials at Box Hill Cemetery
Australian operatic sopranos
Singers from Melbourne
20th-century Australian women opera singers